Coughton railway station serving Coughton, Warwickshire was a station on the Barnt Green to Evesham line. The station was opened by the Evesham and Redditch Railway on 4 May 1868. The station had one platform and a simple brick building.
The station had a short siding similar to Wixford.

The station closed on 30 June 1952. The road bridge which was near the platform has now been demolished and Sambourne Lane now runs through the site of the bridge. The station building is now a private residence and has been heavily altered. The platform edge can still clearly be identified.

References

Further reading

External links 
 
 Warwickshirerailways.com
 Rail around Birmingham

Former Midland Railway stations
Railway stations in Great Britain opened in 1868
Railway stations in Great Britain closed in 1952
Disused railway stations in Warwickshire